A kill switch is a security measure used to shut off or render a device inoperable in an emergency.

Kill Switch or Killswitch may also refer to:

Film and television
 Kill Switch (2008 film), a film starring Steven Seagal
 Kill Switch (2017 film), an American-Dutch film directed by Tim Smit
 Killswitch (film), a 2014 documentary about the battle for control of the Internet
 "Kill Switch" (CSI: Miami), a television episode
 "Kill Switch" (The X-Files), a television episode

Literature
 Kill Switch, a 2016 Joe Ledger Series novel by Jonathan Maberry
 The Kill Switch, a 2014 Tucker Wayne novel by James Rollins and Grant Blackwood

Music
 Kill Switch...Klick or Kill Switch, an American industrial rock band
 "Kill Switch", a song by Chet Faker from Built on Glass

Other uses
 Kill Switch (video game), a 2003 third-person shooter
 Killswitch (professional wrestling) or inverted double underhook facebuster, a finishing move used by the professional wrestler Christian
 Internet kill switch, a shut-off mechanism for all Internet traffic